Lee Ha-sung (born 6 June 1994) is a wushu taolu athlete from South Korea. He was a world champion in 2015 and gold medalist at the Asian Games in 2014.

Career 
In his international debut, Lee won the first gold medal for South Korea at the 2014 Asian Games in the men's changquan event. He then competed at the 2015 World Wushu Championships where he won a gold medal in the compulsory changquan event. Two years later at the 2017 World Wushu Championships, Lee was a double silver medalist in jianshu and duilian. At the 2018 Asian Games, Lee had a major deduction on one of his difficulty movements and finished in 12th place in the men's changquan event, thus was unable to defend his title from 2014. A year later. he won a bronze medal in changquan and a silver medal in duilian at the 2019 World Wushu Championships.

Competitive history

Competitive History

See also 

 List of Asian Games medalists in wushu

References

External links 

 Athlete Profile at the 2018 Asian Games

1994 births
Living people
South Korean male martial artists
South Korean wushu practitioners
Wushu practitioners at the 2014 Asian Games
Wushu practitioners at the 2018 Asian Games
Asian Games gold medalists for South Korea
Medalists at the 2014 Asian Games
Asian Games medalists in wushu
Competitors at the 2022 World Games
World Games silver medalists
World Games medalists in wushu